Holy Rosary Church Complex is a historic Roman Catholic church complex located in the Edgerton neighborhood of Rochester, Monroe County, New York.  The complex consists of the church (1916), rectory (c. 1916), convent (1911), and two-story garage.  All buildings in the complex are in a Spanish eclectic, Arts and Crafts style.  The buildings are constructed of hollow tile brick and three feature their original Spanish clay tile roofs.  The church features a rose window in the Mudéjar style similar to that of the Mission San Carlos Borromeo de Carmelo. The church also features a square brick bell tower in the southwest corner.

The complex was listed on the National Register of Historic Places in 2012.

References

Churches on the National Register of Historic Places in New York (state)
Mission Revival architecture in New York (state)
Roman Catholic churches completed in 1911
20th-century Roman Catholic church buildings in the United States
Roman Catholic churches in Rochester, New York
National Register of Historic Places in Rochester, New York